The Men's 50 metre rifle three positions pairs event took place on 8 October 2010, at the CRPF Campus.

Results

Shooting at the 2010 Commonwealth Games